Vincent and Me (French-language title: Vincent et moi) is a 1990 French Canadian fantasy film. The movie was directed by Michael Rubbo and is the 11th in the Tales for All (Contes Pour Tous) series of children's movies created by Les Productions la Fête.

Jeanne Calment, appeared as herself, aged 114, the oldest person to ever appear in a motion picture, a fact that gained her a placing in Guinness World Records. Calment claimed to have met Vincent van Gogh ca. 1888 when she was 12 or 13.

Plot 
Jo, a girl from Quebec, loves to draw, and she is good enough at it to win a scholarship. She goes to the city from her small town to study at a special art school, where more than anything else, she hopes to learn to paint like her hero, Vincent van Gogh. While sketching faces one day, she encounters a mysterious European art dealer who buys a few of her drawings, and commissions her to do some more. He rewards her handsomely for her work, and goes back to Amsterdam. Not long after, Jo is shown a magazine story about the "discovery" and million dollar sale of some of the drawings of young Vincent van Gogh, drawings only she and her friend, Felix, know are hers. The only thing to do is for Jo and friends to get to Amsterdam and find the mystery man. Or better still, go right to the source and speak to Vincent himself in 19th century Arles.

Cast 
 Nina Petronzio as Jo
 Christopher Forrest as Felix Murphy
 Paul Klerk as Joris
 Vernon Dobtcheff (billed as Alexandre Vernon Dobtchef) as Dr. Winkler
 Anna-Maria Giannotti as Grain
 Andrée Pelletier as Mrs. Wallis
 Matthew Mabe as Tom Mainfield
 Tchéky Karyo as Vincent van Gogh
 Jeanne Calment as herself
 Kiki Classen
 Maria Giannotti
 Inge Ipenburg
 Michel Maillot
 Wally Martin
 Martijn Overing

References

External links 
 
 

1990 films
Films directed by Michael Rubbo
Films about Vincent van Gogh
1990s children's fantasy films
Canadian children's fantasy films
French-language Canadian films
1990s Canadian films